Charles Hubert Bronson, Jr (born 1949) is an American public official who served as Commissioner of Florida Department of Agriculture and Consumer Services. He was appointed to the position in 2001 by Governor Jeb Bush, then reelected in 2002 and 2006.

Bronson attended Osceola High School and graduated from the University of Georgia in 1972, earning a B.S. degree in agricultural education and animal and meat sciences. From 1994 to 2001,  Bronson was in the Florida Senate, representing Brevard County and Osceola County.

References

External links
Biography on the Florida Department of Agriculture and Consumer Services website

Living people
1949 births
University of Georgia alumni
Florida state senators
Florida Commissioners of Agriculture
People from Kissimmee, Florida